Çıkrık may refer to the following places in Turkey:

Çıkrık, Afyonkarahisar, a town in Afyonkarahisar Province
Çıkrık, Çorum, a village in Çorum Province